William Taylor (7 May 1821 – 29 March 1878) was an English cricketer. Taylor's batting and bowling styles are unknown. He was born at Dorking, Surrey.

Taylor made his first-class debut for Surrey against Kent at The Oval in 1852. He made two further first-class appearances for the county, against Kent at The Oval in 1853, and Sussex at the Royal Brunswick Ground in 1855. In his three first-class appearances for the county, he took a total of 2 wickets at an average of 43.00, with best figures of 1/23. With the bat, he scored 15 runs at a batting average of 3.00, with a high score of 10.

He died at Kennington, Surrey, on 29 March 1878.

References

External links
William Taylor at ESPNcricinfo
William Taylor at CricketArchive

1821 births
1878 deaths
People from Dorking
English cricketers
Surrey cricketers